Bayan II was an Avar khagan between 602 and 617.

 

617 deaths
7th-century monarchs in Europe
Pannonian Avars
Year of birth unknown